FadeAway Magazine is a quarterly magazine which is published in the United Kingdom that covers basketball. The publication was launched in June 2009.

History
FadeAway was founded by Jake Green and Mike Baptiste, with Greg Tanner as editor and Harry Adams as art director.  The magazine was renamed as MVP in 2010. The first issue appeared on 4 October 2010. The magazine is published by Response London on a quarterly basis.

References

External links
 Official website

Basketball magazines
Sports magazines published in the United Kingdom
Quarterly magazines published in the United Kingdom
Magazines established in 2009